Kyabjé Drubwang Padma Norbu Rinpoche, 1932 – 27 March 2009, was the 11th throneholder of the Palyul Lineage of the Nyingma school of Tibetan Buddhism, and said to be an incarnation of Vimalamitra. He was widely renowned in the Tibetan Buddhist world as a master of Dzogchen. He was one of a very few teachers left from his generation who received all his training (in the traditional sense) in Tibet under the guidance of what Tibetan Buddhists consider to be fully enlightened teachers.

Biography

Life in Tibet
The Third Drubwang Padma Norbu Rinpoche, Thubten Legshed Chokyi Drayang, also known as Do-ngag Shedrub Tenzin Chog-lei Namgyal was born in 1932, the year of the Water Monkey, in the twelfth month, in the Powo region of Kham, East Tibet. He was recognized in 1936 by the Fifth Dzogchen Rinpoche (Thubten Chokyi Dorje) and Khenpo Ngawang Palzang (also known as Khenchen Ngagi Wangchuk, Ngawang Palzangpo, or Khenpo Ngagchung). Padma Norbu was formally enthroned by his root teacher, Thubten Chökyi Dawa (1894–1959) the second Chogtrul Rinpoche, and Karma Thegchog Nyingpo (1908–1958) the Fourth Karma Kuchen. He trained at the Palyul Monastery in Tibet, studying and receiving teachings from numerous masters and scholars, including the Fourth Karma Kuchen, the 10th Palyul throneholder.

Establishment in India
In 1959, recognizing the situation in Eastern Tibet to be very tense, Penor Rinpoche left with a party of 300 for Pemako in Northeast India. Only 30 of the original party survived. In 1961, they were resettled in South India in Bylakuppe in a series of Tibetan camps where Penor Rinpoche initially built a bamboo temple to train a small handful of monks in 1963.

Life in India
In the 1970s, Penor Rinpoche began to train Khenpos in the Nam Cho cycle. By the 1980s Namdroling Monastery had many hundreds of monks. In 1993, a nunnery was added, and by 2004 there were 4000 monks and 800 nuns at the monastic center.

Teachings in Western countries
He made his first visit to the United States in 1985, invited by Gyaltrul Rinpoche to Ashland, Oregon, to confer the Nam Cho cycle of teachings. In 1987 he recognized Catharine Burroughs as the incarnation of Genyenma Ahkön Lhamo. The historical Genyenma Ahkön Lhamo was the sister of the founder of Palyul, Kunzang Sherab.

In 1988 he gave the Kama teachings at Gyatrul Rinpoche's Yeshe Nyingpo center in Ashland, Oregon, followed immediately thereafter by the Longchen Nyingthig at Ven. Peling Tulku Rinpoche's centre in Canada, Orgyan Osal Cho Dzong. After this he gave the Rinchen Terzod empowerments at Kunzang Palyul Choling. Towards the end of this cycle of empowerments he ordained 25 western monks and nuns.

In 1995,  was invited by John Giorno to give teachings and empowerments for a week in New York City. He then traveled to Kunzang Palyul Choling to give the Nam Chö cycle. After this trip, he sent Khenpo Tsewang Gyatso, who had previously taught in the U.S. in 1992, to establish centers in New York and other regions.

In 1998, he established the Palyul Retreat Center in McDonough, New York, offering a one-month retreat course that follows a similar if abbreviated curriculum to the one at Namdroling monastery.  He offered Kalachakra empowerments, first in Rochester in 1996 and next at his retreat center in 2007. He also granted the Nam Chö cycle of teachings in Austin, Texas, in 2002.

Head of the Nyingmapa
Within the Nyingma school there was no main throneholder; thus, upon onset of the Tibetan diaspora, there was a request from the Tibetan Government in Exile to the Nyingmapa followers to request someone to be such a representative: someone of the highest esteem who could be responsible for all of the Nyingma followers. Request was usually made during Nyingma Monlam Chenmo in Bodhgaya.
 Dudjom Jigdral Yeshe Dorje (c. 1904–1987), was unanimously requested to become first Head of the Nyingmapas and served from the 1960s until his death.
 Dilgo Khyentse (c. 1910–1991), was requested to become second Head of the Nyingmapas and served from 1987 until his death.
 Drubwang Padma Norbu Rinpoche (1932–2009), was requested to become third Head of the Nyingmapas and served from 1991 until retirement in 2001.
 Mindrolling Trichen (c. 1930–2008), was requested to become fourth Head of the Nyingmapas and served from 2003 until his death.
 Chatral Sangye Dorje was requested to become fifth Head of the Nyingmapas, but declined.
 Trulshik Rinpoche (1923-2011) served as the fifth Head of the Nyingmapas from 2010 until his death.
 Dodrupchen Rinpoche (1927-2022) was requested to become the sixth Head of the Nyingmapas, but declined.
 Taklung Tsetrul Rinpoche (1926-2015), served from 2012 until his death.
 Katok Getse Rinpoche (1954-2018), Was asked to assume the role in 2018 for the agreed 3-year rotation period, has accepted but died before completion of the term.
 Dzogchen Rinpoche (b. 1964) Was asked to assume the role in 2019 for the agreed 3-year rotation period but declined. 
 Shechen Rabjam Rinpoche Was asked to assume the role in 2019 for the agreed 3-year rotation period but declined. Issuing the statement which with everyone's agreement resulted in the position responsibilities transfer to the head of Nyingma Monlam Chenmo.

Activities

Monlam Chenmo
Each year a prayer festival called "Monlam Chenmo" is held in Bodh Gaya, the place of the Buddha's Enlightenment. Recognizing its importance, Penor Rinpoche headed a committee of monks, tulkus and khenpos who organized the yearly prayer ceremony.

South Indian Monastery
He was responsible for an ever-expanding population of Himalayan monks and nuns who come to Namdroling Monastery based on the traditional cultural style of sending a son or daughter to the monastery for an education. Many of the young monks and nuns come from extremely impoverished families located in Bhutan, Nepal or the Tibetan refugee camps in India. The monastery provides full room, board, clothing, medical care and an education in the traditional Tibetan Buddhist canon. The population of students exceeds several thousand.

South Indian local community
He sponsored the pavement of the road leading from Bylakuppe to Kushalnagar. He also built a small hospital that still requires equipment, but provides infirmary services to the local community. A side benefit of his activities is that the temples he built brings busloads of Indian tourists to the area daily, increasing the income and economic activity in the area.

Worldwide
His main U.S. representative is Khenchen Tsewang Gyatsho Rinpoche, who maintains a yearly travel schedule that includes Canada, Singapore as well as Arizona, California, Florida, Montana, New York, Ohio, Texas, Virginia, and Washington, DC.

Centers for practice are located internationally, including India, Taiwan, Hong Kong, and the United States.

Retreats
Monks and international students went on retreat with Penor Rinpoche and received teachings directly from him on two occasions per year.  The first was in the 2nd month of the lunar calendar at Namdroling Monastery in South India.  The second was in the United States at Palyul Ling.  The retreats consisted of the teachings as structured within the Nam Chö cycle beginning with Ngondro, followed by the Inner Heat practice of Tsa Lung, and then Dzogchen Trekcho and Togyal.

The Successive Incarnations of the Drubwang Padma Norbu Rinpoche
The First Drubwang Padma Norbu Rinpoche (1679–1757, aged 79). The 3rd Throne Holder of the Palyul Tradition.
The Second Drubwang Padma Norbu Rinpoche, Padma Kunzang Tanzin Norbu also known as Thubtan Chokyi Langpo, also known as Rigzin Palchen Dupa (1887–1932, aged 46). The 9th Throne Holder of the Palyul Tradition.
The Third Drubwang Padma Norbu Rinpoche, Thubten Legshed Chokyi Drayang also known as Do-ngag Shadrub Tanzin Chog-las Namgyal (1932–2009, aged 77). The 11th Throne Holder of the Palyul Tradition.
Penor Rinpoche Yangsi: The Fourth Drubwang Padma Norbu Rinpoche, Mingyur Dechen Garwang Zilnon Dorje of Tibet. Enthroned on July 31, 2014.

Palyul lineage
The Palyul lineage was founded in 1665 by Kunzang Sherab (1636–1699). It is based out of Palyul Monastery, one of the six "mother" monasteries of the Nyingma lineage.  The primary teachings followed by Palyul Monasteries were revealed by Terton Migyur Dorje, a "Dharma Treasure Revealer" who received teachings mystically.  The works of Migyur Dorje have been passed down from teacher to disciple as the Nam Chö or "space treasure" cycle of teachings.  It was these teachings that HH Penor Rinpoche followed and transmitted to his students along with some texts from the Longchen Nyingthig cycle.

On 27 March 2009, at around 21:30 Indian Standard Time, Penor Rinpoche died at his residence at the Namdroling Monastery.

Well in advance of his death, Penor Rinpoche requested the Fifth Karma Kuchen Rinpoche, his designated successor, to establish his seat at Palyul Monastery in Tibet. The Fifth Karma Kuchen is 12th and current Palyul throne holder.

Monasteries

Palyul Monastery
Palyul Monastery has been rebuilt in Tibet since the Cultural Revolution.  The temple was re-inaugurated in 2006 by HH Penor Rinpoche's schoolmate, Tulku Thubsang Rinpoche.

Namdroling Monastery

His main monastery and most recent "seat" was the Namdroling Monastery, located in South India, home also to the Ngagyur Nyingma Institute, where hundreds of monks study and graduate from a ten-year shedra program which includes a three-year retreat afterwards. Three senior khenpos (professors of Buddhist philosophy), Khenchen Pema Sherab Rinpoche, Khenchen Namdrol Rinpoche, and Khenchen Tsewang Gyatsho Rinpoche oversee the education of the thousands of monks and nuns enrolled in study at shedra (Buddhist college).

Palyul Monasteries in North India
A Palyul monastery was reestablished in exile in Bir Tibetan Colony, India, by Penor Rinpoche's close friend, Dzongnang Rinpoche. Its current abbot is Rigo Tulku Rinpoche.

Other Palyul Monasteries
There are many small branch monasteries throughout Tibet. There are also dharma centers across the globe including Canada, England, Germany, Hong Kong, India, Macau, Taiwan, Singapore, Philippines, and the United States that were founded under HH Penor Rinpoche's guidance.

Prominent students
Penor Rinpoche's students include his "heart sons" the Fifth Karma Kuchen (successor to the Palyul throne), Khentul Gyangkhang Rinpoche, and Mugsang Kuchen Rinpoche. Other prominent students include Jetsunma Ahkon Lhamo, Ngawang Jigdral Rinpoche, Sakyong Mipham Rinpoche, Khentrul Lodro Thaye Rinpoche, Minling Khenchen Rinpoche and many others. The three most senior Khenpos from Namdroling Monastery are Khenchens Palden Sherab, Tsewang Gyatso, and Namdrol Tsering.

References

Bibliography
 Tsering Lama Jampal Zangpo (1988), A Garland of Immortal Wish-Fulfilling Trees, Ithaca, NY: Snow Lion Publications. , 
 Nyoshul Khen Rinpoche (2005), "A Marvelous Garland of Rare Gems: Biographies of Masters of Awareness in the Dzogchen Lineage", Junction City, CA: Padma Publishing.

External links
 Official website of the Palyul Nyingma tradition and HH Penor Rinpoche
 The official website of Namdroling Monastery
 Rigpa Wiki article
 Rangjung Yeshe Wiki article

1932 births
2009 deaths
20th-century lamas
21st-century lamas
Buddhist monks from Tibet
Lamas from Tibet
Nyingma lamas
Rinpoches
Tibetan Buddhists from Tibet
20th-century Buddhist monks